The women's 200 metre backstroke competition of the swimming events at the 1991 Pan American Games took place on 18 August. The last Pan American Games champion was Katie Welch of US.

This race consisted of four lengths of the pool, all in backstroke.

Results
All times are in minutes and seconds.

Heats

Final 
The final was held on August 18.

References

Swimming at the 1991 Pan American Games
Pan